Cypa terranea is a species of moth of the family Sphingidae first described by Arthur Gardiner Butler in 1876. It is known from Sundaland.

References

Cypa
Moths described in 1876